The Flight into Egypt is a biblical event described in the Gospel of Matthew.

Flight into Egypt may also refer to:

Paintings
 The Flight into Egypt (El Greco) (c. 1570)
 The Flight into Egypt (Elsheimer) (c. 1609)
 The Flight into Egypt (Lorrain) (1635)
 The Flight into Egypt (Murillo) (1647–1650)
 The Flight into Egypt (Poussin) (1657/8)
 The Flight into Egypt (Rembrandt) (1627)

Music
 The Flight into Egypt (Harbison), a 1986 composition by John Harbison

See also
 The Flight into Egypt in a Boat, a 1764–1770 painting by Giovanni Battista Tiepolo
 Landscape with the Flight into Egypt (disambiguation)
 Rest on the Flight into Egypt (disambiguation)